Kashipur may refer to:

Places
 Kashipur, Uttarakhand, a city and a municipal corporation in Udham Singh Nagar District in the state of Uttarakhand, India
 Kashipur, Rayagada, located in the district of Rayagada in the state of Odisha, India
 Kashipur, Purulia, located in the district of Purulia in the state of West Bengal, India
 Chak Kashipur, a census town under Nadakhali police station of Alipore sadar subdivision in South 24 Parganas district  in the state of West Bengal, India
 Cossipore (also spelt Cossipur, Kashipur), a neighbourhood in north Kolkata in the state of West Bengal, India
 Kashipur, Raebareli, a village in Uttar Pradesh, India

Electoral constituencies
 Kashipur, Uttarakhand Assembly constituency - in Udham Singh Nagar district, Uttarakhand, India
 Kashipur, West Bengal Assembly constituency - in Purulia district, West Bengal, India
 Kashipur-Belgachhia Assembly constituency - in Kolkata district, West Bengal, India
 Cossipur Assembly constituency - former constituency in Kolkata district, West Bengal, India

Community development blocks
 Kashipur (community development block) - in Purulia district, West Bengal, India